John J. Wooten (born 1965) is an American playwright, screenwriter, director, producer, and professor.

Best known as a playwright, Wooten has been nominated for Best New Play by the American Critics Association for The Mission Home  (1998). Wooten is the winner of the New Jersey State Council on the Arts Fellowship for Kiss the Bride (1995) and for Fading Grace (2021). The Mission Home (1998), Kiss the Bride (1995) and Happy Hour (2003) were nominated for Best New Play by the Newark Star-Ledger.
Wooten's work has been published Dramatist Play Service.

Career

Wooten is a founding member and Producing Artistic Director of Premiere Stages. Wooten is the resident director for the Peter Ustinov screenwriting competition presented each year by the International Academy of Television Arts and Sciences  Before being hired in 2004 to launch Premiere Stages, Wooten served ten seasons as Artistic Director of TheatreFest, where he produced and or/directed over fifty professional Equity productions. Wooten's plays have been produced Off-Broadway and his premieres include The Role of Della, an ATL finalist.

References

20th-century American dramatists and playwrights
Living people
1965 births